In Polynesian mythology, Merau is a goddess of death and the underworld.

References

Polynesian goddesses
Death goddesses